The Wenatchee AppleSox is a collegiate summer baseball team playing in the West Coast League's North Division. The team is based in Wenatchee, Washington. The team was established in 2000 by owner Jim Corcoran and has played its home games at Paul Thomas Sr. Field on the campus of Wenatchee Valley College.  Asst. GM Ken Osborne became a stockholder in 2008.  Corcoran and Osborne sold the team to retired Microsoft executive Jose Oglesby in 2018, with Osborne being appointed COO/GM. Osborne stepped down on Feb. 3, 2021, and assistant general manager Allie Schank was promoted to general manager.

Team history

2000–2013
The AppleSox began play in 2000 and joined the Pacific International League. The AppleSox marked the return of baseball to the Wenatchee Valley for the first time since the Wenatchee Chiefs suspended operations after the 1965 season. The AppleSox were a member of the PIL until 2004, when the team left the league to become a charter member of the West Coast League. The team won the PIL Championship in 2003 and has won five WCL Championships in the league's history, including back-to-back titles in 2009 and 2010.

2014
The 2014 season marked the first year that the AppleSox did not make the WCL Playoffs. The team was 30–24 in regular-season play. As the season concluded, Sox head coach, Ed Knaggs stepped down and AJ Proszek was selected to replace him, making Proszek the 3rd head coach all-time for the AppleSox. Proszek was a pitching coach for Wenatchee in 2013 and 2014. The changing of the coaching reins put an end to a 14-year run for Knaggs as the head coach in Wenatchee. He also had previously coached 22 seasons at Wenatchee High School.

2015–2016
The AppleSox went 43–65 over the next two WCL seasons, and were unable to reach the WCL postseason. The AppleSox did feature two of the more prolific hitters in WCL history in each of the 2015 season and 2016 seasons. Keston Hiura, an outfielder from UC Irvine, set WCL records with 33 extra-base hits, 119 total bases, and 6 triples. Michael Toglia (2016) became the third AppleSox player to win league MVP, joining Mitchell Gunsolus (2012) and Steve Marquardt (2005). He hit .306 and led the WCL with 7 home runs. At the end of the 2016 season, A J Proszek announced that he would not return for a third season as the team's head coach. The AppleSox hired Kyle Krustangel just over a month later, on September 14, 2016.

2017-2019
Krustangel kept the AppleSox in playoff contention until the final weekend of the season in each of his first two seasons before finally breaking through in 2019. The AppleSox won 17 of their final 25 games to earn their first playoff spot since 2013. Krustangel quit following the 2019 season to accept the same job with the Yakima Valley Pippins. Ian Sanderson of Lower Columbia College was subsequently hired as the fifth head coach in AppleSox history.

2022
The AppleSox made the postseason for the first time under a first-year head coach in 2022 after winning the WCL North Division's second-half title. Mitch Darlington guided the team to a 27-27 record and a first-round sweep of the Kamloops NorthPaws before falling to the Bellingham Bells in the North Division Championship Game. Second baseman Joichiro Oyama won WCL co-MVP by breaking AppleSox single-season records for plate appearances (276), runs (54), stolen bases (42) and walks (42) while also tying for the single-season record for triples (6) and games played (54). He also broke the WCL single-season record for runs and stolen bases with his historic 2022 campaign.

Ballpark traditions

Kid's choir
AppleSox games feature a special seventh-inning stretch. Local kids are invited out to the mound with the team's mascot, "Coyote", to sing "Take Me Out to the Ballgame".

Strikeout socks
The AppleSox hang embroidered socks from a clothesline on the press box, each time their pitcher strikes out an opposing batter. After five strikeouts by AppleSox pitching the team's guest services workers toss socks to fans in the seating area.

Race the Coyote
Long-time AppleSox mascot Coyote rounds the bases each night in a race against an AppleSox youngster. He still hasn't beaten any kids in the daily race, but has accumulated a few wins on various "Mascot" nights over the years, when he races other local mascots instead of children.

Ketchup and Mustard Race 
During the fifth inning of each home game everyone's two favorite condiments race each other above the right-field wall.

Tommy Watanabe Award
AppleSox pitcher Tommy Watanabe died late in the 2017 season to the shock of the team and his family and friends. He left an indelible mark on all whom he interacted with and the AppleSox began honoring him the following the season with an award in his name. The Tommy Watanabe Award is annually presented to the AppleSox player who best shows passion and respect for baseball as well as those who play or work in the game. Wenatchee native Jacob Prater was presented with the inaugural award in 2018 and Johnny Sage won it the following the year. Michael O'Hara was recognized in 2021 before Joichiro Oyama was honored in 2022.

Section 'A'
The fans at Paul Thomas Sr. Field take a special liking each year to the AppleSox first base-coach, giving him a loud ovation each time he jogs to the coaches box. The tradition began with the fans in section A along the first baseline in 2006 and has spread across the entire stadium.

Season-by-Season Record

Division champions

PIL
 2002
 2004

WCL
 2005
 2008
 2009
 2010
 2011
 2012
 2013

League champions

PIL
 2003

WCL
 2005
 2006
 2009
 2010
 2012

Notable alumni
 Cole Gillespie (2004)
 Jason Hammel (2001)
 Tommy Milone (2006)
 Clay Mortensen (2005–2006)
 Trevor Brown (2010)
 Marco Gonzales (2010)
 Simon Rosenbaum (2014)
 Griffin Canning (2014)
 Keston Hiura (2015)
 Michael Toglia (2016)

References

External links
 

Amateur baseball teams in Washington (state)
Wenatchee, Washington